Patriarch Seraphim of Constantinople may refer to:

 Seraphim I of Constantinople, Ecumenical Patriarch in 1733–1734
 Seraphim II of Constantinople, Ecumenical Patriarch in 1757–1761